The 36th Los Angeles Film Critics Association Awards, given by the Los Angeles Film Critics Association (LAFCA), honored the best in film for 2010.

Winners

Best Picture:
The Social Network
Runner-up: Carlos
Best Director (TIE):
Olivier Assayas – Carlos
David Fincher – The Social Network
Best Actor:
Colin Firth – The King's Speech
Runner-up: Édgar Ramírez – Carlos
Best Actress:
Kim Hye-ja – Mother (Madeo)
Runner-up: Jennifer Lawrence – Winter's Bone
Best Supporting Actor:
Niels Arestrup – A Prophet (Un prophète)
Runner-up: Geoffrey Rush – The King's Speech
Best Supporting Actress:
Jacki Weaver – Animal Kingdom
Runner-up: Olivia Williams – The Ghost Writer
Best Screenplay:
Aaron Sorkin – The Social Network
Runner-up: David Seidler – The King's Speech
Best Cinematography:
Matthew Libatique – Black Swan
Runner-up: Roger Deakins – True Grit
Best Production Design:
Guy Hendrix Dyas – Inception
Runner-up: Eve Stewart – The King's Speech
Best Music Score (TIE):
Alexandre Desplat – The Ghost Writer
Trent Reznor and Atticus Ross – The Social Network
Best Foreign Language Film:
Carlos • France/Germany
Runner-up: Mother (Madeo) • South Korea
Best Documentary/Non-Fiction Film:
Last Train Home
Runner-up: Exit Through the Gift Shop
Best Animation:
Toy Story 3
Runner-up: The Illusionist (L'illusionniste)
New Generation Award:
Lena Dunham – Tiny Furniture
Career Achievement Award:
Paul Mazursky
The Douglas Edwards Experimental/Independent Film/Video Award:
Jean-Luc Godard – Film Socialisme
Legacy of Cinema Awards:
Serge Bromberg for Henri-Georges Clouzot's Inferno (L'enfer d'Henri-Georges Clouzot)
The F. W. Murnau Foundation and Fernando Pena for the restoration of Metropolis

References

External links
 36th Annual Los Angeles Film Critics Association Awards

2010
Los Angeles Film Critics Association Awards
Los Angeles Film Critics Association Awards
Los Angeles Film Critics Association Awards
Los Angeles Film Critics Association Awards